Miriam was the sister of Moses in the Bible.

Miriam or Myriam (the French variant) may also refer to:

People
 Miriam (given name)
 Miriam Yeung, Cantopop singer, sometimes known as just "Miriam"
 Miriam Stockley, South African-born British singer
 Mirriam, the English vocaloid from Zero-G, voiced by Miriam Stockley
 Miriam, pen name of Zenon Przesmycki (1861-1944), Polish poet, translator and art critic
 Miriam (TV personality), a Mexican reality television show transsexual woman
 Myriam Montemayor Cruz, better known as Myriam, a Mexican recording artist

In music
 Myriam (Myriam album)
 Myriam (Myriam Faris album)
 Mirriam, an album by Jessi Colter

In science
 102 Miriam, an asteroid
 Minimum Information Required in the Annotation of Models (MIRIAM), an effort to standardise the annotation and curation process of quantitative models of biological systems

Other uses
 Hurricane Miriam (disambiguation), six tropical cyclones in the Eastern Pacific Ocean
 "Miriam" (short story), by Truman Capote
 Miriam (film), a 1957 Finnish film
 Meriam language, also spelled Miriam, spoken by the people of several islands in the Torres Strait, Queensland, Australia
 Miriam Hospital, a private, not-for-profit hospital in Providence, Rhode Island
 Miriam College, Quezon City, Philippines, a Catholic school for girls and young women

See also
 Hurricane Joan–Miriam, a 1988 hurricane that struck the Caribbean and Central America
Maryam (disambiguation)
Mariam (disambiguation)